Liga Veneta Repubblica (Łiga Vèneta Republica, Venetian Republic League, LVR) is a Venetist political party in Veneto, Italy. The party maintains a mildly separatist position and campaigns for the self-government of Veneto.

The party's founder and long-time leader is Fabrizio Comencini.

The LVR emerged in 1998 as a split from Liga Veneta (LV), the "national section" of Lega Nord in Veneto. Originally named Liga Veneta Repubblica, it changed its name to Veneti d'Europa (after the merger with Future Veneto in 2000) and Liga Fronte Veneto (after the merger with Fronte Marco Polo in 2001). It finally assumed again the original title in 2007.

In 2000 the party included eight regional councillors, three deputies and four senators (all LV defectors).

History

Foundation and early years
In September 1998, after some clashes with Umberto Bossi, Fabrizio Comencini, national secretary of Liga Veneta (LV) since 1994, tried to lead the party out of Lega Nord (LN), a federation of regional parties. This move was opposed by Bossi's loyalists and he was finally expelled from the party and replaced by Gian Paolo Gobbo as leader of the LV.

Subsequently, seven out of eight members of LV–LN's group in the Regional Council of Veneto (Fabrizio Comencini, Ettore Beggiato, Alessio Morosin, Mariangelo Foggiato, Alberto Poirè, Michele Munaretto and Franco Roccon) left the party and launched Liga Veneta Repubblica (LVR), which was initially intended to be the legal continuation and legitimate heir of the LV. Another councillor, Adriano Bertaso of North-East Union, who had earlier left the LN, joined the party for a while. Comencini's followers represented the more Venetist and separatist wing of the LV, while the people who remained in the LN were mainly fiscal federalists and Padanists. The former were also keen on an alliance with the centre-right Pole of Freedoms coalition in Veneto in support of President Giancarlo Galan, with whom Comencini signed a pact in August 1999.

Despite the entity of the split among elects, most voters of the LV remained loyal to Gobbo and Bossi. In the 1999 European Parliament election the LVR won 3.5% of the vote in Veneto: a good result for a new party, but far less than the LV, which gained a disappointing 10.7% though, and far less than expected. However, the LVR had some local strongholds: San Bonifacio (20.9% over LV's 7.0% in 1998), Schio (11.8% over 11.1% in 1999), Arcole (44.1% over 6.0% in 1999), Camisano Vicentino (21.6% over 5.9% in 1999), Creazzo (15.5% over 14.7% in 1999), Chiuppano (34.8% and elected mayor in 1999), Monticello Conte Otto (14.6% over 7.2% in 1999), Resana (24.6% over 7.8% in 1999), Spresiano (62.2% over 9.1% and elected mayor in 1999) and Torri di Quartesolo (15.8% in 1999).

For the 2000 regional election the LV entered an alliance with the Pole of Freedoms that excluded the LVR. The party, whose name was changed to Veneti d'Europa, won 2.4% (0.6% under the threshold needed), due to the presence of another Venetist party, Fronte Marco Polo (1.2%), and an electoral recovery of the LV (12.0%). The name Veneti d'Europa (Venetians for Europe) was chosen as the LVR merged with Future Veneto, member of the Autonomists for Europe, a federation of splinter groups from the LN.

Liga Fronte Veneto and split
In 2001 the party, at the time led by the Venetist historian Beggiato, was merged with Fronte Marco Polo into the new Liga Fronte Veneto. Giorgio Vido was elected national secretary and Comencini national president. In 2001 general election Bepin Segato, a separatist activist in jail for having opposed Italian national unity, was a party candidate for the Senate. Despite gaining more than 5.6% of the votes in Veneto (mainly disgruntled voters of the LN, after the alliance with Silvio Berlusconi's Forza Italia) and more than 10% in several single-seat constituencies, the party was not able to elect any representative to the Italian Parliament.

In 2003 Beggiato replaced Vido as national secretary in a time when the party was not represented in the institutions and was shrinking in popular support. In 2004 Beggiato tried to lead the party into North-East Project (PNE), even if PNE leader Giorgio Panto wanted LFV members to join not as a party but as individuals. Comencini ruled out the idea, that would have meant giving up the party's identity. After a tumultuous congress, a group led by Beggiato, Foggiato and Munaretto switched to PNE, while Comencini was elected national secretary and Morosin national president.

During this time, the party did occasionally better than the LV in local elections. This was the case of Cittadella in 2002 (14.9% over 5.5%) and San Bonifacio in 2004 (17.8% over 4.7%): in both cases, LFV candidates, Massimo Bitonci and Silvano Polo respectively, were elected mayors in run-offs. Bitonci, who re-joined the LV, was re-elected in 2007, while Polo did not stand for re-election and the LFV supported the defeated centre-left candidate.

Decline and more splits
In the 2005 regional election the party supported the centre-left candidate for president, Massimo Carraro, winning only 1.2% of the vote, while PNE won 5.4% (16.1% in the Province of Treviso), and being excluded again from the Regional Council. For the 2006 general election Comencini forged an alliance with The Union coalition led by Romano Prodi, but voters seemed to not like the idea and the party stopped at 0.7%.

In the 2007 provincial election of Vicenza, the LFV supported Giorgio Carollo, along with parties both from the centre-left and the centre-right: Veneto for the EPP, Italy of Values, UDEUR, Christian Democracy. Carollo scored 9.9%, while the LFV took only 1.6%, compared with 2.3% of PNE and 19.0% of the LV, whose candidate Attilio Schneck was elected President by a landslide. Soon after the election the party returned to its original name, Liga Veneta Repubblica, under which it ran in the 2008 general election.

In October 2008 the LVR signed a coalition pact with North-East Project (PNE) and Venetian Agreement (IV) for the next municipal, provincial and regional elections "in order to provide an adequate representation to the Venetian people, in line with what happens in Europe, from Scotland to Catalonia, from Wales to Brittany, where federalist, autonomist and independentist parties, who respond uniquely to their territory, see their popular support increasing." However, in the 2009 provincial and municipal election the LVR chose to support the candidates of the Union of Christian and Centre Democrats (UDC), having its best result in the Province of Padua (1.6%).

For the 2010 regional election, after having formed Veneto Freedom (VL) with other Venetist parties, the party finally chose to support Antonio De Poli (UDC) for President under the banner of North-East Union (UNE), along with UNE, PNE and IV. This decision caused two splits: the more independentist wing, led by Silvano Polo, joined the new Party of the Venetians (PdV) and the left-wing minority faction, led by Bortolino Sartore and Giorgio Vido, formed a new party called Liga Veneto Autonomo (LVA) in support of Giuseppe Bortolussi, the centre-left candidate. In the election the list won 1.5% of vote, with peaks of 1.9% and 1.8% in the provinces of Treviso and Belluno, and Mariangelo Foggiato (PNE) was elected to the Council. The LVA, which was able to present its list only in the Province of Vicenza, one of LVR's strongholds, won 1.1% of the vote there, that is to say a big share of the votes (1.6%) the LVR gained in 2005.

In the 2013 general election the LVR obtained 0.7% of the vote regionally, 1.2% in its stronghold of Vicenza.

Independence We Veneto
In July 2013 the LVR joined Let Veneto Decide, a loose cross-party committee for a referendum on Veneto's independence (see Venetian nationalism#Recent developments), along with Stefano Valdegamberi (the regional councillor who presented bill 342/2013 on the referendum), Venetian Independence (IV, the party which had envisioned the campaign), Veneto State (VS), Raixe Venete, Veneto First, other Venetist groups and individuals.

In March 2014 the party was a founding member of United for Independent Veneto, a more structured federation of Venetist and separatist parties, including also VS, Independent Venetians (VI) and Valdegamberi's Popular Future (FP). In July 2014 the coalition was transformed into "We Independent Veneto" (NVI), after the entry of other parties, notably including North-East Project and Chiavegato for Independence.

After the exit of Chiavegato and his group from the alliance and their alignment with Alessio Morosin's IV, the remaining parties of NVI formed a joint list for the 2015 regional election named Independence We Veneto (INV), a sort of re-edition of 2010's North-East Union, but with a separatist platform and in support of Luca Zaia, incumbent President of Veneto and candidate of the LV–LN. In the election, the list won 2.7% of the vote (0.2% more than IV) and Antonio Guadagnini of VS was elected regional councillor in the provincial constituency of Vicenza.

In May 2017 Comencini and other INV leaders were briefly members of Great North (GN), a liberal and federalist party.

Sometime in 2018 Comencini stepped down as secretary, being replaced by Gianluigi Sette and becoming president instead.

In the 2019 local elections the LVR stood with its own lists in San Bonifacio, Negrar and Arzignano.

Back with Liga Veneta
For the 2020 regional election the party entered in alliance with the LV for the first time since the 1998 split. In the election, the LV sponsors three lists, its own, Luca Zaia's personal list and the "Venetian Autonomy List", whose logo is the LVR's one with minor modifications, especially "List" instead of "Liga" and the "Autonomy" banner in the lower part, along with LVR's acronym. The LVR obtained 2.4% of the vote, electing Tomas Piccinini to the Regional Council.

Popular support 
The electoral results of the party in Veneto in the regional and general elections for the Senate since 1999 are shown in the chart below.

Electoral results

Regional Council of Veneto

Italian Parliament

European Parliament

Leadership

 National secretary: Fabrizio Comencini (1998–2000), Ettore Beggiato (2000–2001), Giorgio Vido (2001–2003), Ettore Beggiato (2003–2004), Fabrizio Comencini (2004–2018), Gianluigi Sette (2018–present)
 National president: Mariangelo Foggiato (1998–1999), Donato Manfroi (1999–2000), Fabrizio Comencini (2000–2004), Alessio Morosin (2004–2007), Gian Pietro Piotto (2009–2018), Fabrizio Comencini (2018–present)

References

Sources
 Francesco Jori, Dalla Łiga alla Lega. Storia, movimenti, protagonisti, Marsilio, Venice 2009
 Ezio Toffano, Short History of the Venetian Autonomism, Raixe Venete

External links
 Official website

Political parties in Veneto
Political parties established in 1998
Venetian nationalism
European Free Alliance